Hovet may refer to:

Places

Norway
Hovet, Agder, a village in the municipality of Valle in Agder county
Hovet, Buskerud, a mountain village in the municipality of Hol in Viken county
Hovet Church, a church in the municipality of Hol in Viken county

Sweden
Hovet, an arena located in the Johanneshov district of Stockholm

Other
Hovet (band), the backup band to Swedish singer/songwriter Lars Winnerbäck
Hovet (album), the self-titled debut album from Lars Winnerbäck's backup band Hovet
M163, which was called Hovet by Israel